Nergiz is a station on İZBAN's Northern Line. Nergiz is the westernmost station in the Karşıyaka tunnel.

Railway stations in İzmir Province
Railway stations opened in 2001
2001 establishments in Turkey
Karşıyaka District